The Law and Society Trust is a non-profit making body in Sri Lanka that was set up in Colombo in 1982 and its
headquartered at No. 3 Kynsey Terrace, Colombo 00800, Sri Lanka. The activities of the trust concerns with improving public awareness on civil and political rights; social, economic and cultural rights and equal access to justice.  The Trust is a member organization of the Asian Forum for Human Rights and Development (FORUM-ASIA).

Mission
The Trust is concerned with the consideration and improvement of professional skills within the legal community. The Law and Society Trust has taken a leading role in promoting co-operation between government and society within South Asia on questions relating to human rights, democracy and minority protection and has participated in initiatives to develop a global intellectual and policy agenda.

Activities
The Trust designs activities and programmes, and commissions studies and publications, which have attempted to make the law play a more meaningful role within the society. The Trust also utilises law as a resource in the battle against underdevelopment and poverty and is involved in the organization of a series of programmes to improve access to the mechanisms of justice, as well as programmes aimed at members of the legal community, to use the law as a tool for social change. These include publications, workshops, seminars and symposia.

Library
The LST Library, which is also home to the Information and Documentation Unit, comprises approximately 8,000 books, including a rare collection of early Sri Lankan legal literature and contemporary archival material, such as the New Law Reports (NLR), Sri Lanka Law Reports (SLR), Legislative Enactments, Acts of Sri Lanka. The reference collection is particularly rich in historical material related to the Sri Lankan legal system. The LST Library also contains over 60 titles of Sri Lankan and International Journals, including bulletins and newsletters that are relevant to existing research programmes. The Library’s special collections include the Sam Kadirgamar collection, which was acquired in 1991, and consists of a substantial number of legal texts, including Indian, English, South African and Sri Lankan Law Reports as well as a number of key texts on several aspects of the law. The Canada Section, established with the assistance of the Canadian International Development Agency (CIDA), features a collection of the Dominion Law Reports (1956 -1990) and a collection of the Osgoode Hall Law Journals (1958-1989). The Library also holds U.S. Law Reports (1882-1984) and Indian Supreme Court Cases until 2008. Referral services are available to users via our networks with other libraries, such as the Nadesan Centre, Centre for Policy Alternatives and the International Centre for Ethnic Studies. The LST Library is open to the public and subscription to it is free.

See also
 Dr.Nissanka Wijeyeratne - founder chairman of The Law and Society Trust
 Neelan Tiruchelvam - founder and director of The Law and Society Trust

References

External links
  The Law and Society Trust

Human rights organisations based in Sri Lanka
1982 establishments in Sri Lanka